The Aviator is a 2004 American epic biographical drama film directed by Martin Scorsese and written by John Logan. It stars Leonardo DiCaprio as Howard Hughes, Cate Blanchett as Katharine Hepburn, and Kate Beckinsale as Ava Gardner. The supporting cast features Ian Holm, John C. Reilly, Alec Baldwin, Jude Law, Gwen Stefani, Kelli Garner, Matt Ross, Willem Dafoe, Alan Alda, and Edward Herrmann.

Based on the 1993 non-fiction book Howard Hughes: The Secret Life by Charles Higham, the film depicts the life of Howard Hughes, an aviation pioneer and director of the film Hell's Angels. The film portrays his life from 1927 to 1947 during which time Hughes became a successful film producer and an aviation magnate while simultaneously growing more unstable due to severe obsessive–compulsive disorder (OCD).

Shot in Montreal, Canada,The Aviator was released in the United States on December 25, 2004 to positive reviews with critics praising DiCaprio’s and Blanchett's performances and Scorsese’s direction. It grossed $214 million on a budget of $110 million and received many accolades. At the 77th Academy Awards, it was nominated for eleven awards, including Best Picture, Best Director, Best Original Screenplay, Best Actor for DiCaprio, and Best Supporting Actor for Alda, winning five: Best Cinematography, Best Film Editing, Best Costume Design, Best Art Direction, and Best Supporting Actress for Blanchett. At the 58th British Academy Film Awards, it was nominated for fourteen awards, winning four: Best Film, Best Actress in a Supporting Role for Blanchett, Best Production Design and Best Makeup and Hair. At the 62nd Golden Globe Awards, it was nominated for six awards, winning three: Best Motion Picture — Drama, Best Actor — Motion Picture Drama for DiCaprio and Best Original Score for Howard Shore. In addition, DiCaprio was nominated for Outstanding Male Actor in a Leading Role and Blanchett won Outstanding Female Actor in a Supporting Role at the 11th Screen Actors Guild Awards.

Plot 
In 1913, Houston, eight-year-old Howard Hughes' mother gives him a bath and teaches him how to spell "quarantine", warning him about the recent cholera outbreak. Fourteen years later, in 1927, he begins to direct his film Hell's Angels, and hires Noah Dietrich to manage the day-to-day operations of his business empire. 

After the release of The Jazz Singer, the first partially talking film, Hughes becomes obsessed with shooting his film realistically, and decides to convert the movie to a sound film. Despite the film being a hit, Hughes remains unsatisfied with the end result and orders it to be recut after its Hollywood premiere. He becomes romantically involved with actress Katharine Hepburn, who helps to ease the symptoms of his worsening obsessive–compulsive disorder.

In 1935, Hughes test flies the H-1 Racer, pushing it to a new speed record, despite having to crash-land into a beet field when the aircraft runs out of fuel. Three years later, he breaks the world record by flying around the world in four days. He subsequently purchases majority interest in Transcontinental & Western Air (TWA). 

Juan Trippe, company rival and chairman of Pan Am, gets his crony, Senator Ralph Owen Brewster, to introduce the Community Airline Bill, which would give Pan Am exclusivity on international air travel. Hepburn grows tired of Hughes' eccentricity and workaholism, and leaves him for fellow actor Spencer Tracy. Hughes quickly finds a new love interest with 15-year-old Faith Domergue, and later actress Ava Gardner. However, he still has feelings for Hepburn, and bribes a reporter to keep reports about her and the married Tracy out of the press.

In the mid-1940s, Hughes contracts two projects with the Army Air Forces, one for a spy aircraft, and another for a troop transport unit for use in World War II. 

In 1947, with the H-4 Hercules flying boat still in construction, Hughes finishes the XF-11 reconnaissance aircraft and takes it for a test flight. However, one of the engines fails midflight, and he crashes in Beverly Hills, miraculously surviving the crash. The army cancels its order for the H-4 Hercules, although Hughes still continues the development with his own money. Dietrich informs Hughes that he must choose between funding the airlines or his flying boat. Hughes orders Dietrich to mortgage the TWA assets so he can continue the development.

As his OCD worsens, Hughes becomes increasingly paranoid, planting microphones and tapping Gardner's phone lines to keep track of her, until she kicks him out of her house. The FBI searches his home for incriminating evidence of war profiteering, searching through his possessions. 

Brewster privately offers to drop the charges if Hughes sells TWA to Trippe, but Hughes refuses. Hughes' OCD symptoms become extreme, and he retreats into an isolated "germ-free zone" for three months. Trippe has Brewster summon him for a Senate investigation, certain that Hughes will not show up. Gardner visits him and personally grooms and dresses him in preparation for the hearing.

An invigorated Hughes defends himself against Brewster's charges and accuses the Senator of taking bribes from Trippe. He concludes by announcing that he has committed to completing the H-4 aircraft, and that he will leave the country if he cannot get it to fly. Brewster's bill is promptly defeated. 

After successfully flying the aircraft, Hughes speaks with Dietrich and his engineer, Glenn Odekirk, about a new jetliner for TWA. However, he begins hallucinating men in germ-resistant suits, and has a panic attack. As Odekirk hides him in a restroom while Dietrich fetches a doctor, Hughes begins to have flashbacks of his childhood, his love for aviation and his ambition for success, compulsively repeating the phrase "the way of the future".

Cast

Production

Development 
Warren Beatty planned to direct and star in a Hughes biopic in the early 1970s. He co-wrote the script with Bo Goldman after a proposed collaboration with Paul Schrader fell through. Goldman wrote his own script, Melvin and Howard, which depicted Hughes' possible relationship with Melvin Dummar. Beatty's thoughts regularly returned to the project over the years, and in 1990 he approached Steven Spielberg to direct Goldman's script. Beatty's Hughes biopic was eventually released under the title Rules Don't Apply in 2016. Charles Evans, Jr. purchased the film rights of Howard Hughes: The Untold Story in 1993. Evans secured financing from New Regency Productions, but development stalled.

The Aviator was a joint production between Warner Bros., which handled Latin American and Canadian distribution, and Disney, which released the film internationally under its Miramax Films banner in the United States and the United Kingdom. Disney previously developed a Hughes biopic with director Brian De Palma and actor Nicolas Cage between 1997 and 1998. Titled Mr. Hughes, the film would have starred Cage in the dual roles of both Hughes and Clifford Irving. It was conceived when De Palma and Cage were working on Snake Eyes with writer David Koepp. Universal Pictures joined the competition in March 1998 when it purchased the film rights to Empire: The Life, Legend and Madness of Howard Hughes, written by Donald Barlett and James Steele. The Hughes brothers were going to direct Johnny Depp as Howard Hughes, based on a script by Terry Hayes, Universal canceled it when it decided it did not want to fast-track development to compete with Disney. In the mid 1990s and early 2000s, director Miloš Forman was in talks to direct a film about the early life Hughes with Edward Norton as the eccentric young billionaire. Also, in the early 2000s, director Christopher Nolan was developing a film about Hughes based on the book Hughes: The Private Diaries, Memos and Letters by Richard Hack. The film was shelved when Scorsese was on board to direct The Aviator. Nolan returned to his Howard Hughes project after completing The Dark Knight Rises. This time, Nolan used the book Citizen Hughes: The Power, the Money and the Madness by Michael Drosnin as the source of his film. Nolan wrote the script and the script follows the darker and final years of Hughes's life. Nolan, once again, shelved the project when Warren Beatty was developing his long-awaited Hughes film. It was reported that Nolan's Hughes film was to star Jim Carrey as the reclusive, elderly billionaire.

Disney restarted development on a new Howard Hughes biopic in June 1999, hiring Michael Mann to direct Leonardo DiCaprio playing the role of Howard Hughes, based on a script by John Logan. The studio put it in turnaround again following the disappointing box-office performance of Mann's critically acclaimed The Insider. New Line Cinema picked it up in turnaround almost immediately, with Mann planning to direct after finishing Ali. Mann was eventually replaced with DiCaprio's Gangs of New York director Martin Scorsese. Scorsese later said that he "grossly misjudged the budget". Angelina Jolie was approached by the studios to have a role in the film but she turned it down after learning Harvey Weinstein was involved with the film.

Howard Hughes suffered from obsessive-compulsive disorder (OCD), most notably an obsession with germs and cleanliness. Scorsese and DiCaprio worked closely with Dr. Jeffrey M. Schwartz, MD of UCLA, to portray the most accurate depiction of OCD. The filmmakers had to focus both on previous accounts of Hughes’ behaviors as well as the time period, given that when Hughes was suffering from the disorder, there was no psychiatric definition for what ailed him. Instead of receiving proper treatment, Hughes was forced to hide his stigmatized compulsions; his disorder began to conflict with everyday functioning.

DiCaprio dedicated hundreds of hours of work to portray Hughes' unique case of OCD on screen. Apart from doing his research on Hughes, DiCaprio met with people suffering from OCD. In particular, he focused on the way some individuals would compulsively and repeatedly wash their hands, later inspiring the scene in which his hand starts to bleed as he scrubs it in the bathroom. The character arc of Howard Hughes was a drastic one: from the height of his career to the appearance of his compulsions, and eventually, to him sitting naked in a screening room, refusing to leave, and later repeating the phrase "the way of the future."

Cinematography 

In an article for the American Cinematographer, John Pavlus wrote: "The film boasts an ambitious fusion of period lighting techniques, extensive effects sequences and a digital re-creation of two extinct cinema color processes: two-color and three-strip Technicolor." For the first 52 minutes of the film, scenes appear in shades of only red and cyan blue; green objects are rendered as blue. This was done, according to Scorsese, to emulate the look of early bipack color films, in particular the Multicolor process, which Hughes himself owned, emulating the available technology of the era. Similarly, many of the scenes depicting events occurring after 1935 are treated to emulate the saturated appearance of three-strip Technicolor. Other scenes were stock footage colorized and incorporated into the film. The color effects were created by Legend Films.

Production design 
Scale models were used to duplicate many of the flying scenes in the film. When Martin Scorsese began planning his aviation epic, a decision was made to film flying sequences with scale models rather than CGI special effects. The critical reaction to the CGI models in Pearl Harbor (2001) had been a crucial factor in Scorsese's decision to use full-scale static and scale models in this case. The building and filming of the flying models proved both cost-effective and timely.

The primary scale models were the Spruce Goose and the XF-11; both flyable scale models were designed and fabricated over a period of several months by Aero Telemetry, an aerospace company that specializes in building unmanned air vehicles.

The  Spruce Goose model had a wingspan of  while the  XF-11 had a  wingspan. Another set of miniatures was built as a motion control miniature used for "beauty shots" of the model taking off and in flight as well as in dry dock and under construction at the miniature Hughes Hangar built by New Deal Studios. The XF-11 was reverse engineered from photographs and some rare drawings and then modeled in Rhinoceros 3D by the Aero Telemetry engineering department and New Deal art department. These 3D models of the Spruce Goose as well as the XF-11 were then used for patterns and construction drawings for the model makers. In addition to the aircraft, the homes that the XF-11 crashes into were fabricated at 1:4 scale to match the 1:4 scale XF-11. The model was rigged to be crashed and break up several times for different shots.

The Aero Telemetry team was given only three months to complete three models including the 450 lb H-1 Racer, with an  wingspan, that had to stand-in for the full-scale replica that was destroyed in a crash, shortly before principal photography began.

The models were shot on location at Long Beach and other California sites from helicopter or raft platforms. The short but much heralded flight of Hughes’ HK-1 Hercules on November 2, 1947 was realistically recreated in the Port of Long Beach. The motion control Spruce Goose and Hughes Hangar miniatures built by New Deal Studios are on display at the Evergreen Aviation Museum in McMinnville, Oregon, with the original Hughes H-1 Spruce Goose.

Release

Distribution 
Warner Bros. Pictures originally bought North American distribution rights to The Aviator shortly before production on the film began. However, a heavy release schedule for Warner Bros. during the fourth quarter of 2004 prompted the company to start discussions to sell US distribution rights to Miramax Films. The talks were successful, with Warner Bros. and Miramax splitting costs and revenues 50/50 on the film's domestic release. Miramax Films distributed the film in the United States, the United Kingdom as well as Italy, France and Germany. Trifecta Entertainment & Media (via Miramax) also held the rights to the US television distribution, while Warner Bros. Pictures retained the rights for home video/DVD distribution in North America and theatrical release in Canada and Latin America. Initial Entertainment Group released the film in the remaining territories around the world.

Box office performance 
The Aviator was given a limited release on December 17, 2004 in 40 theaters where it grossed $858,021 on its opening weekend. It was given a wide release on December 25, 2004, and opened in 1,796 theaters in the United States, grossing $4.2 million on its opening day and $8.6 million in its opening weekend, ranking #4 with a per theater average of $4,805. On its second weekend, it moved up to #3 and grossed $11.4 million – $6,327 per theater. The film grossed $102.6 million in the United States and Canada and $111.1 million overseas, for a worldwide total of $213.7 million, against an estimated production cost of $110 million.

Home media 
The film was released on DVD in a two-disc-set in widescreen and full screen versions on May 24, 2005. The first disc includes commentary with director Martin Scorsese, editor Thelma Schoonmaker and producer Michael Mann. The second disc includes "The Making of 'The Aviator' ", "Deleted Scenes", "Behind the Scenes", "Scoring The Aviator", "Visual Effects", featurettes on Howard Hughes as well as other special features. The DVD was nominated for Best Audio Commentary (New to DVD) at the DVD Exclusive Awards in 2006.

The film was later released in high definition on Blu-ray Disc and HD DVD on November 6, 2007.

Reception

Critical response 

On the review aggregator website Rotten Tomatoes, The Aviator has an approval rating of 86% based on 227 reviews, with an average rating of 7.80/10. The site's critical consensus reads: "With a rich sense of period detail, The Aviator succeeds thanks to typically assured direction from Martin Scorsese and a strong performance from Leonardo DiCaprio, who charts Howard Hughes' descent from eccentric billionaire to reclusive madman." On Metacritic, the film received a weighted average score of 77 out of 100, based on 41 critics, indicating "generally favorable reviews". Audiences polled by CinemaScore gave the film an average grade of "B+" on an A+ to F scale.

Roger Ebert of Chicago Sun-Times gave the film four stars out of four and described the film and its subject, Howard Hughes, in these terms: "What a sad man. What brief glory. What an enthralling film...There's a match here between Scorsese and his subject, perhaps because the director's own life journey allows him to see Howard Hughes with insight, sympathy – and, up to a point, with admiration. This is one of the year's best films." In his review for The Daily Telegraph, Sukhdev Sandhu praised Scorsese's direction, DiCaprio and the supporting cast but considered Beckinsale "miscast". Of the film, he said it is "a gorgeous tribute to the Golden Age of Hollywood" even though it "tips the balance of spectacle versus substance in favour of the former." David T. Courtwright in The Journal of American History characterized The Aviator as a technically brilliant and emotionally disturbing film. According to him, the main achievement for Scorsese is that he managed to restore the name of Howard Hughes as a pioneer aviator.

Accolades 

The film was nominated for eleven Academy Awards, winning five for Best Cinematography, Best Film Editing, Best Costume Design, Best Art Direction and Best Supporting Actress for Blanchett. It was also nominated for fourteen BAFTAs, winning four for Best Film, Best Makeup and Hair, Best Production Design and Best Actress in a Supporting Role, six Golden Globe Awards, winning three for Best Motion Picture – Drama, Best Original Score and Best Actor – Motion Picture Drama for DiCaprio and three Screen Actors Guild Awards, winning one for Outstanding Performance by a Female Actor in a Supporting Role.

Aircraft depicted and used 

Numerous aircraft were depicted and/or actually used in the film, and were organic to the story. These included aircraft that Hughes had built, airliners that his airline (TWA) used, and other aircraft. Among these were:

 Hughes H-1 Racer, a pioneering single-engine race plane that set speed records, including the 1935 international speed record of 352 mph, and the 1937 U.S. transcontinental record of seven hours, 28 minutes. It featured many relatively new innovations in aircraft design, and was the "state of the art" aircraft of its time, briefly. The original is in the Smithsonian's National Air and Space Museum. A replica planned for the movie crashed, and a model was used instead.
 Hughes XF-11, a photographic reconnaissance plane—a twin-engine, twin-boom, fast, high-flying aircraft designed during World War II (WWII) to fly faster and higher than enemy fighters. It was originally commissioned by the U.S. government in a contract with Hughes Aircraft, but the war ended while the aircraft was still in development. The first prototype was equipped with troublesome contra-rotating propellers which failed while Hughes was piloting it on its maiden flight; he did not react properly to the propeller failure and was critically injured in the ensuing crash in Beverly Hills, as depicted in the film. A second prototype equipped with conventional single propellers later flew successfully, but the military had chosen other aircraft for its purpose, and it was scrapped. As the movie shows, Hughes was subsequently accused of duping the military and failing to deliver, leading to a congressional investigation. Models replicated the plane for the movie.
 Hughes HK-1 / H-4 Hercules (nicknamed the Spruce Goose for its all-wood construction), a giant flying boat transport—one of the largest and most famous aircraft ever built. As with the XF-11, its development was originally commissioned by the U.S. government during WWII in a contract with Hughes Aircraft, the war ended while the aircraft was still in development, the contract was canceled, and it became a topic in the resulting congressional investigation. Hughes responded that he would prove the Hercules could fly—and subsequently did so in a short hop in Long Beach Harbor (though historians note that the aircraft never escaped ground effect, near the surface, to fly completely free and at altitude). The airplane never flew again, and became a floating museum display, dockside in the harbor—eventually moved to the Evergreen Aviation Museum in Oregon. The real aircraft was used sparingly in the movie, but only models of it actually move in the film.
 Sikorsky S-38 amphibian—a "flying yacht" for the wealthy. This medium-sized, twin-engined flying boat, with retractable wheels, was among Hughes' personal aircraft. Though several were built for wealthy fliers in the 1930s (including Hughes), none survive, today—except for two replicas that were built in recent years at a cost of well over $1,000,000 apiece (these were used in the film).
  L-049 Lockheed Constellation airliner, one of the first pressurized-cabin, ocean-spanning airliners, largely developed for Hughes' airline, TWA. The airplane was conspicuous for its triple-tail vertical stabilizers, and shapely curving fuselage. The Constellation was powered by four of the largest piston engines ever built by 1941, the Wright R-3350 Duplex-Cyclone (bested by the Pratt & Whitney R-4360 Wasp Major in 1944), it became the most advanced airliner in the world at its inception—capable of transcontinental flights in half the normal time (as little as seven hours). It was used by the military in World War II, and became one of the world's principal airliners of the 1950s, instrumental in making TWA the world's largest airline. The film used a Lockheed L-1049 Super Constellation in TWA livery, C/N 4830 Star of America, a Constellation restored to airworthiness, flown to and from the Burbank airport for filming from Kansas City MO, and stored at the National Airline History Museum in Kansas City, Missouri (TWA's former home base).

See also 
 The Aviator (soundtrack)
 Mental illness in film
 The Amazing Howard Hughes (1977)
 Melvin and Howard (1980)
2004 in film
List of American films of 2004
77th Academy Awards
62nd Golden Globe Awards
58th British Academy Film Awards
11th Screen Actors Guild Awards

References

Further reading 

 Floyd, Jim. The Avro Canada C102 Jetliner. Erin, Ontario: Boston Mills Press, 1986. .
 Higham, Charles. Howard Hughes: The Secret Life. New York: St. Martin's Griffin, 2004. .
 Maguglin, Robert O. Howard Hughes, His Achievements & Legacy: the Authorized Pictorial Biography. Long Beach, California: Wrather Port Properties, 1984. .
 Marrett, George J. Howard Hughes: Aviator. Annapolis, Maryland: Naval Institute Press, 2004. .
 Wegg, John. General Dynamic Aircraft and their Predecessors. London: Putnam, 1990. .

External links 

 
 
 
 
 

2004 films
2004 biographical drama films
2004 drama films
2000s American films
2000s English-language films
American aviation films
American biographical drama films
American business films
American epic films
Appian Way Productions films
BAFTA winners (films)
Best Drama Picture Golden Globe winners
Best Film BAFTA Award winners
Biographical films about aviators
Biographical films about businesspeople
Cultural depictions of Errol Flynn
Cultural depictions of Howard Hughes
Cultural depictions of Katharine Hepburn
Epic films based on actual events
Films about actors
Films about aviators
Films about filmmaking
Films about obsessive–compulsive disorder
Films based on biographies
Films directed by Martin Scorsese
Films featuring a Best Drama Actor Golden Globe winning performance
Films featuring a Best Supporting Actress Academy Award-winning performance
Films produced by Graham King
Films produced by Michael Mann
Films scored by Howard Shore
Films set in 1913
Films set in 1927
Films set in 1929
Films set in 1935
Films set in 1938
Films set in 1941
Films set in 1946
Films set in 1947
Films set in the 1920s
Films set in the 1930s
Films set in the 1940s
Films set in California
Films set in Connecticut
Films shot in Montreal
Films that won the Best Costume Design Academy Award
Films whose art director won the Best Art Direction Academy Award
Films whose cinematographer won the Best Cinematography Academy Award
Films whose editor won the Best Film Editing Academy Award
Films with screenplays by John Logan
Golden Eagle Award (Russia) for Best Foreign Language Film winners
Initial Entertainment Group films
Miramax films
Warner Bros. films